The Diamantina Fracture Zone (DFZ) is an area of the south-eastern Indian Ocean seafloor, consisting of a range of ridges and trenches. It lies to the south of the mideastern Indian Ocean features of the Wharton Basin and Perth Basin, and to the south west of the Naturaliste Plateau.

Escarpment
Being parallel to the Southeast Indian Ridge, the Diamantina Fracture Zone is not a true fracture zone in the sense used in plate tectonics, but rather an escarpment, separating two oceanic plateaus. Its extension to the west is called the Diamantina Escarpment. This is the southern border of the Broken Ridge Plateau. All these features are mirrored by corresponding topography on the other side of the Southeast Indian Ridge. The Broken Ridge Plateau was formed at the ridge together with the Kerguelen Plateau.

Exploration
It is named after , which conducted further exploration in 1961. Professor Alan Jamieson from The University of Western Australia led a scientific expedition to the eastern margin of the DFZ, which enters the southwest corner of the Australian exclusive economic zone. Professor Jamieson's team deployed baited landers beyond  water depth aiming to document the biodiversity and geology of the region.

Bathymetry
The first high-resolution multibeam bathymetry of the central DFZ was collected between June 2014 and June 2016, for the purpose of searching for Malaysia Airlines Flight 370 (MH370), which disappeared on 8 March 2014.

Based on this research, it was suggested that the Dordrecht Deep within the DFZ in the southeast Indian Ocean, and the Sunda Trench in the eastern Indian Ocean (~), are the two candidates for the deepest points in the Indian Ocean.

To resolve this debate, the Diamantina Fracture Zone was surveyed by the Five Deeps Expedition in March 2019 by the Deep Submersible Support Vessel DSSV Pressure Drop, equipped with a full-ocean depth Kongsberg SIMRAD EM124 multibeam echosounder system. This confirmed that the Diamantina Fracture Zone does not contain the deepest point in the Indian Ocean, but may be the second deepest point after the Sunda Trench.

The shallowest point in the area is the  point in the Broken Ridge, close to Ninety East Ridge.

See also
 Oceanic trench
 Sunda Arc

References

External links
 Location on Google map

Fracture zones
Oceanic trenches of the Indian Ocean